The Masters Tournament is a golf competition that was established in 1934, with Horton Smith winning the inaugural tournament. The Masters is the first of four major championships to be played each year, with the final round of the Masters always being scheduled for the second Sunday in April. The Masters is the only one of the four majors to use the same course every year; the Augusta National Golf Club. Masters champions are automatically invited to play in the other three majors (the U.S. Open, the Open Championship (British Open), and the PGA Championship) for the next five years, and earn a lifetime invitation to the Masters. They also receive membership on the PGA Tour for the following five seasons and invitations to the Players Championship for the five years following their victory. The champion also receives the "Green Jacket", the first one being won by Sam Snead in 1949. The champion takes the jacket home for a year and returns it thereafter. A multiple champion will only have one jacket unless his size changes dramatically.

Jack Nicklaus holds the record for the most Masters victories, winning the tournament six times during his career. Nicklaus is also the oldest winner of the Masters: he was 46 years 82 days old when he won in 1986. Nicklaus, Nick Faldo, and Tiger Woods co-hold the record for most consecutive victories with two. Woods was the youngest winner of the Masters, 21 years 104 days old when he won in 1997. Woods also set the record for the widest winning margin (12 strokes). The lowest winning score, with 268, 20-under-par, was scored by Dustin Johnson in 2020.

The highest winning score of 289 (+1) was originally set by Sam Snead in 1954, it was equalled by Jack Burke Jr. in 1956, and Zach Johnson in 2007. Five golfers have won the Masters wire-to-wire; Craig Wood in 1941, Arnold Palmer in 1960, Nicklaus in 1972, Raymond Floyd in 1976, and Jordan Spieth in 2015. Other players have led wire-to-wire if ties after a round are included, most recently Dustin Johnson in the 2020 Masters Tournament. Scottie Scheffler is the current champion. He won the 2022 Masters Tournament with a score of 278 (−10).

Champions

By year

Multiple champions

By nationality

Notes

  Par is a predetermined number of strokes that a golfer should require to complete a hole, a round (the sum of the total pars of the played holes), or a tournament (the sum of the total pars of each round). E stands for even, which means the tournament was completed in the predetermined number of strokes.
  The 1943, 1944, and 1945 Masters Tournaments were not held because of World War II.
  Gene Sarazen won in a playoff against Craig Wood.
  Byron Nelson won in a playoff against Ben Hogan.
  Sam Snead won in a playoff against Ben Hogan.
  Arnold Palmer won in a playoff against Dow Finsterwald and Gary Player.
  Jack Nicklaus won in a playoff against Gay Brewer and Tommy Jacobs.
  Billy Casper won in a playoff against Gene Littler.
  Fuzzy Zoeller won in a playoff against Ed Sneed and Tom Watson.
  Craig Stadler won in a playoff against Dan Pohl.
  Larry Mize won in a playoff against Seve Ballesteros and Greg Norman.
  Nick Faldo won in a playoff against Scott Hoch.
  Nick Faldo won in a playoff against Raymond Floyd.
  Mike Weir won in a playoff against Len Mattiace.
  Tiger Woods won in a playoff against Chris DiMarco.
  Ángel Cabrera won in a playoff against Chad Campbell and Kenny Perry.
  Bubba Watson won in a playoff against Louis Oosthuizen.
  Adam Scott won in a playoff against Ángel Cabrera.
  Sergio García won in a playoff against Justin Rose.

References
General
 

Specific

External links
 Masters website
 Augusta website

Champions

Masters